Charles Terrance Canady (born June 22, 1954) is an American attorney and judge serving on the Supreme Court of Florida since 2008. He previously served two two-year terms as Chief Justice, from 2010 to 2012 and from 2020 to 2022.

Prior to his appointment to the Supreme Court, Canady was a judge on Florida's Second District Court of Appeal from 2002 to 2008, and a Republican member of the United States House of Representatives from 1993 to 2001.

Early life and career 
Born in Lakeland, Florida, Canady graduated with a Bachelor of Arts from Haverford College in 1976 and a Juris Doctor from Yale Law School in 1979. He was admitted to the bar the same year and began his practice in Lakeland. In 1983, he was hired as the legal counsel for the Central Florida Regional Planning Commission. From 1984 to 1990, Canady served as a member of the Florida House of Representatives, initially elected as a conservative Democrat, he switched parties in June 1989. The change created many hard feelings as it happened after he accepted Democratic money for his re-election campaign.  He ran for the Florida State Senate in 1990, but was unsuccessful.

U.S. House of Representatives 
In 1992, Canady made a successful bid for the U.S. House of Representatives, narrowly defeating his Democratic opponent Tom Mims.  In Congress, Canady was credited for coining the term "partial-birth abortion" while developing the Partial-Birth Abortion Ban Act of 1995.  According to Keri Folmar, the lawyer responsible for the bill's language, the term was developed in early 1995 in a meeting among herself, Canady and National Right to Life Committee lobbyist Douglas Johnson.  Canady could not find this particular abortion practice named in any medical textbook and therefore he and his aides named it.  He was one of the House managers appointed to prosecute the impeachment trial proceedings of President Bill Clinton. He did not seek re-election to a fifth term in 2000, keeping a term limits pledge he made in 1992.

Judicial service 
After leaving Congress, Canady served as general counsel for Florida Governor Jeb Bush before he was appointed a judge on the Second Florida District Court of Appeal in 2002, taking seat in November of that year.  On August 27, 2008, Governor Charlie Crist appointed Canady to the Supreme Court of Florida to replace Justice Raoul Cantero, who was returning to private practice.  He became the 82nd Associate Justice of the Florida Supreme Court on September 6, 2008.

In 2013, Governor Rick Scott signed the Timely Justice Act (HB 7101) which overhauled the processes for capital punishment; the United States Supreme Court struck down part of this law in January 2016 in Hurst v. Florida, leading the Florida legislature to pass a new statute.  The new sentencing scheme came before the Florida Supreme Court in October 2016, which held that a death sentence must be issued by a unanimous jury.  Canady was one of two justices to dissent from this opinion, with coverage noting his inclusion amongst Donald Trump's list of potential U.S. Supreme Court nominees which was released less than a month earlier.

See also
 List of American politicians who switched parties in office
 Donald Trump Supreme Court candidates

References

External links 

 
 

|-

|-

|-

|-

|-

|-

1954 births
Living people
20th-century American lawyers
21st-century American lawyers
21st-century American judges
Chief Justices of the Florida Supreme Court
Florida Democrats
Florida lawyers
Justices of the Florida Supreme Court
Haverford College alumni
Judges of the Florida District Courts of Appeal
Members of the Florida House of Representatives
People from Lakeland, Florida
Republican Party members of the United States House of Representatives from Florida
Yale Law School alumni